A brush arbour revival, also known as brush arbour meeting, is a revival service that takes place under an open-sided shelter called an "arbour", which is "constructed of vertical poles driven into the ground with additional long poles laid across the top as support for a roof of brush, cut branches or hay".

History 
Methodists and Baptists widely use brush arbour revivals to communicate the Christian proclamation of salvation, which have historically contributed to the growth of these denominations. For Methodists, this salvation message includes preaching the doctrines of the New Birth and Entire Sanctification, as well as calling backsliders to repentance. They originated in the 1700s, being regularly assembled when itinerant preachers announced in advance that they would be arriving in an area; their design served to protect seekers from precipitation. Though brush arbour revivals continue in the present-day, they are the forerunner of the Methodist campmeetings. Their success has historically led to the planting of local churches, as was the case with Morris Chapel United Methodist Church in Walkertown and Swift Creek Methodist Church in Macon. Many of the first Sunday Schools ran by Methodists were held under brush arbours.

See also 

Camp meeting
Tent revival

References

Notes

Citations

External links 
Construction of a Brush Arbor - Missouri State University
Brush Arbor Meeting - Shannon County Film Digitization Project

Christian revivals
Christian worship and liturgy
Christian terminology
History of Methodism